Harana in Indian Hindu tradition, is capturing a girl to marry her. A wedding where the groom captures the bride by harana is termed a Rakshasa wedding.

See also
Hindu wedding

References

Marriage in India
Indian culture
Hindu wedding rituals